Tracey Kelusky (born September 9, 1975) is a Canadian former lacrosse player and current head coach of Panther City LC. Kelusky played for the Columbus Landsharks, Montreal Express, Calgary Roughnecks, Buffalo Bandits and Philadelphia Wings. While with the Roughnecks, Kelusky was named captain and led them to titles in 2004 and 2009.

College career
Kelusky played college lacrosse at the University of Hartford, making his mark in the NCAA record books by scoring 59 goals in 14 games during the 2000 season.

Professional career
Kelusky joined the NLL in the 2000-2001 season with the Columbus Landsharks and was named the NLL Rookie of the Year.  In the 2001-2002 season, he played for the expansion franchise Montreal Express.  The Roughnecks picked up Kelusky first overall in the dispersal draft after the Express franchise folded in 2002.

In the 2005 National Lacrosse League All-Star Game, Kelusky won the MVP in front of a home crowd at the Pengrowth Saddledome. During the 2009 NLL season, he was named a reserve to the All-Star game.

In December 2013, Kelusky was acquired by the Philadelphia Wings as a free agent.

On September 19, 2014, Kelusky announced he was retiring from professional lacrosse.

Coaching career
After retiring as a player, Kelusky became an assistant coach for the New England Blackwolves. For the 2019-20 season he served as offensive coach for the Philadelphia Wings. Kelusky became the first-ever head coach for the expansion Panther City LC club in 2021.

Statistics

NLL
Reference:

Awards
 2000, Drafted first overall by the Columbus Landsharks
 2001, NLL Rookie of the Year
 2001, NLL second team all pro
 2002, NLL first team all pro
 2002, Inside Lacrosse Magazine's NLL MVP (voted by NLL players and coaches)
 2002, part of Canada's silver medal team at the World Lacrosse Championship
 2002, part of Team Canada at the Heritage Cup
 2003, NLL first team all pro
 2003, part of Canada's gold medal team at the World Indoor Lacrosse Championship
 2004, part of Canada's Heritage Cup-winning team
 2004, NLL first team all pro
 2004, Champion's Cup
 2005, NLL All Star Game Most Valuable Player
 2005, NLL second team all pro
 2007, NLL Sportsmanship Award
 2009, Champion's Cup
 2022, Les Bartley Award

Personal life
Kelusky is a boyhood friend of professional wrestler Bobby Roode. Kelusky even made an appearance on the December 29th, 2011 edition of Impact Wrestling, where he confronted Roode and was attacked by him.

See also
 NCAA Men's Division I Lacrosse Records

External links
 Bio from Buffalo Bandits page

References

1975 births
Living people
Buffalo Bandits players
Calgary Roughnecks players
Canadian lacrosse players
Hartford Hawks men's lacrosse players
Lacrosse people from Ontario
National Lacrosse League All-Stars
National Lacrosse League major award winners
Sportspeople from Peterborough, Ontario
Columbus Landsharks players